Giorgos Koumoutsakos (born 17 September 1961, Athens) is a Greek politician with the liberal New Democracy party, and a member of the European parliament.

References

External links 
 
 

1961 births
Living people
Politicians from Athens
MEPs for Greece 2009–2014
New Democracy (Greece) MEPs
New Democracy (Greece) politicians
Greek MPs 2015 (February–August)
Greek MPs 2015–2019
Greek MPs 2019–2023